The 1989 Preakness Stakes was the 114th running of the Preakness Stakes thoroughbred horse race. The race took place on May 20, 1989, and was televised in the United States on the ABC television network. Sunday Silence, who was jockeyed by Pat Valenzuela, won the race by a nose over runner-up Easy Goer.  Approximate post time was 5:35 p.m. Eastern Time. The race was run over a fast track in a final time of 1:53-4/5. The Maryland Jockey Club reported total attendance of 98,896, this is recorded as second highest on the list of American thoroughbred racing top attended events for North America in 1989.

Jim McKay of ABC Sports labeled it "the best race that I have ever witnessed" during the 1995 Preakness telecast. The stretch duel of the race itself was featured on ABC's Wide World of Sports prelude claiming to be the "thrill of victory" for 12 years. It preceded the more memorable line "and the agony of defeat".

Payout 

The 114th Preakness Stakes Payout Schedule

$2 Exacta:  (8–2) paid   $10.40

$2 Trifecta:  (8-2–5) paid   $66.00

The full chart 

 Winning Breeder: Oak Cliff Thoroughbreds, Ltd.; (KY) 
 Final Time: 1:53 4/5
 Track Condition: Fast
 Total Attendance: 98,896

See also 

 1989 Kentucky Derby

References

External links 

 

1989
1989 in horse racing
1989 in sports in Maryland
1989 in American sports
Horse races in Maryland